Bruckman is a surname. Notable people with the surname include:

Amy S. Bruckman (born 1965), American associate professor
Clyde Bruckman (1894–1955), American writer and director of comedy films
Clyde Bruckman's Final Repose
Lodewijk Bruckman (1903–1995), Dutch painter
 Shimshon Bruckman (born 1957), Israeli Olympic sailor

See also
Bruckmann